Gyula Tóth (12 April 1936, in Túrkeve – 2 November 2006, in Ózd) was a Hungarian marathon runner. He ran a time of 2:34:49 in the 1968 Summer Olympics marathon, and a time of 2:22:59 in the 1972 Summer Olympics marathon. He won the Košice Peace Marathon in 1966 and 1971 and won a bronze medal at the 1966 European Athletics Championships. He won the Budapest Marathon in 1969 and 1971.

References

1936 births
2006 deaths
Hungarian male marathon runners
Athletes (track and field) at the 1968 Summer Olympics
Athletes (track and field) at the 1972 Summer Olympics
Olympic athletes of Hungary
People from Túrkeve
Sportspeople from Jász-Nagykun-Szolnok County
20th-century Hungarian people